Chender is a village in the Boumerdès Province in Kabylie, Algeria.

Location
The village is surrounded by Chender River and Sebaou River, and the towns of Naciria and Bordj Menaïel.

Notable people

 Mohamed ben Zamoum
 Omar ben Zamoum

References

Villages in Algeria
Boumerdès Province
Kabylie